Arachnidium are a genus of colonial ctenostome bryozoans. They lack a calcified cuticle and form dense encrusting colonies on barnacles or other shelled organisms. Individual zooids are roughly 150 microns in size, have a lophophore with about 13 tentacles, and have about 10 to 11 connections to other zooids in the colony.

References

 
Bryozoan genera